The 2019 Louisiana lieutenant gubernatorial election was held to elect the Lieutenant Governor of Louisiana. Incumbent Republican Lieutenant Governor Billy Nungesser won re-election to a second term.

Louisiana is the only state that has a jungle primary system where all candidates appear on the same ballot, regardless of party, and voters may vote for any candidate, regardless of their party affiliation. If no candidate had received an absolute majority of the vote during the primary election on October 12, 2019, a runoff election would have been held on November 16, 2019, between the top two candidates in the primary. (California and Washington have a similar "top two primary" system).

Candidates

Republican Party

Declared
Billy Nungesser, incumbent  Lieutenant Governor of Louisiana

Democratic Party

Declared
Willie Jones, activist

General election

Results

See also 
United States elections, 2019
Lieutenant Governor of Louisiana

References

External links
Official campaign websites
 Billy Nungesser (R) for Lt. Governor

Lieutenant gubernatorial
Louisiana lieutenant gubernatorial election
2019
Louisiana